Siniša Oreščanin "Six" (born 30 July 1972) is a Croatian professional football manager and former player who was recently the manager of Prva HNL club Gorica.

Playing career 
Oreščanin started his football career at a younger age in cadets and juniors at Dinamo Zagreb as a central midfielder, and spent his senior career at several lower league clubs in Zagreb and the surrounding area. He also played for Croatian clubs from Bosnia and Herzegovina for a while. On three occasions, he played for NK Maksimir and besides it, he played for NK Sesvete, Dugo Selo, ZET, TŠK, Sesvetski Kraljevec and Lučko, and during the 1990s he played for HNK Ljubuški and Sloga Uskoplje in the First League of Herzeg-Bosnia. Playing for Ljubuški he also won two Herceg-Bosnia Cup titles. He ended his playing career in 2006 as the captain of Maksimir.

Managerial career 
Oreščanin started his coaching career as an active player, working in Sesvete from 1999 to 2007. During this time he worked as a junior coach, manager of football academy and first team coach. After six years in junior section, in 2006 he got the opportunity to lead the first team and remained at the helm of the team until 2007.

Dinamo Zagreb (youth) 
After Sesvete, he went to NK Zagreb to coach the young players, where he stayed for two years before leaving for Dinamo Zagreb, with which he achieved remarkable results in five years of work.
From 2009 to 2014, the young generations of Dinamo achieved great results, both domestically and internationally. In addition to winning several national championships, they also achieved great results at the Manchester United Premier Cup, a competition considered by many to be the strongest in that age category globally, winning the second place in Europe and the sixth in the world.
In his several years of work at Dinamo, numerous young and later senior national team players passed through his hands.

In parallel with his work at Dinamo from 2010 to 2011, he was hired as coach in Croatian national teams up to 14 and 15 years old. 

After leaving Dinamo, in 2015 he led the first team of Dugo Selo. He went to Saudi Arabia and worked there at one of the biggest clubs, Al Nassr, as the coach of the under-19 team with which he won the Cup winner title and the second place in the Championship.

Hajduk Split  
After the Saudi adventure, at the invitation of Krešimir Gojun, the head of the Hajduk Split Academy, he came to Split, where he became a cadet trainer in the first phase, and then of the second team of Hajduk. He led the second team in the Druga HNL, and his tenure will remain marked by giving the opportunity to numerous young players who won their place in the first team of Hajduk with their games, and some of them very quickly achieved rich foreign transfers.

After a very poor Hajduk's starting the season under the leadership of Željko Kopić, the first team of Hajduk was taken over by Zoran Vulić, but he also failed to significantly improve the situation, so the management of the club decided to make another change and on 27 November 2018, Oreščanin was appointed manager.

He took the team left in a very difficult situation, in the sixth place in the championship ranking, far from the positions leading to the European competitions, and he placed the ranking among the top four as a goal before the leaders of Hajduk. Under his leadership, Hajduk experienced a rebirth, joining the fight for the second position, and in his only complete half-season on the Hajduk bench, only Dinamo won more points than his team.

The team's great games also resulted in higher prices for some players, so his tenure will remain marked by the sales of two young footballers whose career originated from Poljud, under his leadership; Ante Palaversa was sold to Manchester City and Domagoj Bradarić to Lille. Oreščanin's Hajduk was adorned with a great game, with Mijo Caktaš imposing himself as the creator, who exploded in the second part of the season after only three goals in the first part of the season and won the title of the top scorer of the Croatian First League, whose numerous attributes were owned precisely to Oreščanin's style of play.

He was dismissed as Hajduk coach on 19 July 2019 as a victim of inner fights in the club, following the shocking elimination of Hajduk by Maltese side Gzira United in the 2019–20 UEFA Europa League first qualifying round.

In the Hajduk history books, Oreščanin will remain inscribed as the coach with the best average points earned in the Croatian First League since independence.

Gorica 
On 3 January 2021, Oreščanin took over Croatian top division side HNK Gorica as head coach. 

On 24 May 2021 after Gorica failed to secure a spot in the 2021–22 Europa Conference League second qualifying round through the national championship, Oreščanin was sacked by the club together with his assistant, Goran Rosanda.

Managerial statistics

References

External links
 

1972 births
Living people
Footballers from Zagreb
Association football midfielders
Croatian footballers
NK Sesvete players
NK Ljubuški players
NK TŠK Topolovac players
NK Lučko players
NK Maksimir players
Croatian football managers
HNK Hajduk Split managers
HNK Gorica managers
Croatian expatriate football managers
Expatriate football managers in Saudi Arabia
Croatian expatriate sportspeople in Saudi Arabia
GNK Dinamo Zagreb non-playing staff